Blackhawk is the eponymous fictional character of the long-running comic book series Blackhawk first published by Quality Comics and later by DC Comics. Primarily created by Chuck Cuidera with input from both Bob Powell and Will Eisner, the Blackhawk characters first appeared in Military Comics #1 (August 1941).

Led by a mysterious man known as Blackhawk, the Blackhawks (or more formally, the Blackhawk Squadron) are a small team of World War II-era ace pilots of varied nationalities, each typically known under a single name, either their given name or their surname. Though the membership roster has undergone changes over the years, the team has been portrayed most consistently as having seven core members.

In their most well-known incarnation, the Blackhawks operate from a hidden base known only as Blackhawk Island, fly Grumman XF5F Skyrocket fighter aircraft, and shout their battle cry of "Hawk-a-a-a!" as they descend from the skies to fight tyranny and oppression. Clad in matching blue and black uniforms (with Blackhawk himself boasting a hawk insignia on his chest), early stories pitted the team against the Axis powers, but they would also come to battle recurring foes such as King Condor and Killer Shark, as well as encounter an array of gorgeous and deadly femme fatales. They also frequently squared off against fantastical war machines ranging from amphibious "shark planes" and flying tanks, to the aptly named War Wheel, a gigantic rolling behemoth adorned with spikes and machine guns.

At the height of his popularity in the early 1940s, Blackhawk titles routinely outsold every other comic book but Superman. Blackhawk also shares the distinction of being just one of five comic book characters to be published continuously in their own titles from the 1940s up to the 1960s (the others being Superman, Batman, Wonder Woman and The Phantom).

The comic book series has spawned a film serial, a radio series, a novel, and has been announced as a forthcoming Steven Spielberg feature film. A grounded version of Blackhawk named Ted Gaynor appeared on television in the first season of the Arrowverse series Arrow, played by Ben Browder.

Publication history

Creation
Like many of his golden age and silver age comic book counterparts, the creation of Blackhawk has been the subject of sometimes-contentious debate. Will Eisner has at times been considered the characters' primary creator, with Eisner himself acknowledging the contributions of Chuck Cuidera and writer Bob Powell.

Over the years, Cuidera became increasingly vocal that he did much more work on Blackhawk than Eisner and that he had in fact already started creating the characters prior to joining Eisner's studio. According to Cuidera, he and Powell fleshed out the concept, deciding on everything from names and nationalities, to the characters' distinguishing traits, uniforms, and the aircraft they would fly.

In 1999, Eisner addressed his view of the matter during a Comic-Con panel:

The Quality Comics years

The Blackhawks debuted in August 1941 as the lead feature in the first issue of Quality Comics' anthology series Military Comics, billed as featuring "stories of the Army and Navy". Viewed by Will Eisner as "a modern version of the Robin Hood legend", the team's first appearance was co-written by Chuck Cuidera and Bob Powell, with art by Cuidera. Although the exact nature of Eisner, Cuidera, and Powell's individual contributions to the creation of the Blackhawks will never be known, it is confirmed that each performed some level of writing duties at different times during the first eleven issues, with Eisner working on early covers with Cuidera and Cuidera providing interior artwork.

When Cuidera joined the armed services in 1942, Reed Crandall took over as artist, beginning a long association with the characters that would last until 1953. Jim Steranko has observed, "where Cuidera made Blackhawk a best-seller, Crandall turned it into a classic, a work of major importance and lasting value". It was during Crandall's run that the series hit its sales and popularity zenith.

The Blackhawks' success earned them their own title in Winter 1944. That issue, Blackhawk #9, picked up the numbering of Quality's canceled Uncle Sam Quarterly. They meanwhile continued to be featured prominently in Military Comics, later renamed Modern Comics, until that book's cancellation with #102 (October 1950).

During the Quality years, a whole host of well-respected talent worked on the character, including writers Manly Wade Wellman, Bill Woolfolk, Bill Finger, and Dick French, as well as artists Al Bryant, Bill Ward, and Dick Dillin.

It was French, also an accomplished songwriter, who infused the team with the quirky desire to sing celebratory songs from their cockpits as they swooped in and out of battle.

Quality Comics ceased operations with comics cover-dated December 1956, with Blackhawk #107 being the final issue published by Quality. The character and title trademarks were initially leased on a royalty basis to National Periodical Publications (now DC Comics) before eventually being sold in their entirety.

Acquired by DC Comics
Blackhawk was one of the few Quality series that DC chose to keep running uninterrupted. Penciller Dick Dillin and inker Chuck Cuidera remained on the title, ensuring a near-seamless transition. The duo would stay with the title through nearly its entire first run at DC.

Steering deeper and deeper into the realm of science fiction, the Blackhawks found themselves confronting a steady stream of unmemorable and mostly one-off supervillain-like adversaries bent on world domination.

The Blackhawks also gained a new ally in Blackhawk #133 (February 1959): Lady Blackhawk, a pilot named Zinda Blake who was determined to become the first female member of the team. After a couple of appearances, she was granted honorary status and became a semi-frequent member of the supporting cast.

In an effort to update the characters, DC gave the team its first ever major wardrobe overhaul in Blackhawk #197 (June 1964), replacing their longtime uniforms with red and black shirts and green pants. On a dramatic level, Lady Blackhawk was transformed into a supervillain, Queen Killer Shark, in Blackhawk #200 (September 1964).

Then, in a much more drastic attempt to combat flagging sales due to the rising popularity of superhero books and the Batman TV series, DC proclaimed with Blackhawk #228 (January 1967) the beginning of "the New Blackhawk Era" with a cover featuring Justice League of America members Superman, Batman, Green Lantern, and the Flash observing that the Blackhawks are (in Superman's words) "washed up" and (in Batman's words) "junk-heap heroes". In the issues that followed, all but Blackhawk gained a costumed superhero alter ego at the behest of a shadowy government agency.

With sales continuing to sink, the Blackhawks were restored to something that more closely resembled their original roots in Blackhawk #242 (August 1968), losing the superhero identities in favor of their traditional blue and black uniforms. It was too late though; the comic was canceled for the first time one issue later.

1970s
Just over seven years later, DC Comics resurrected the series with Blackhawk #244 (January 1976) as part of an ongoing mid-1970s expansion of the line dubbed "Conway's Corner" in house ads. The Blackhawks were transplanted to the 1970s and now portrayed as mercenaries-for-hire, matching wits against fancifully bizarre new villains, as well as a re-imagined Killer Shark and War Wheel. This run ended with Blackhawk #250 (January 1977).

1980s–1990s
Amid rampant rumors that Steven Spielberg was interested in Blackhawk as a possible film project, DC Comics once again resumed the series. Initially conceived as being published quarterly, editor Len Wein convinced DC to make the book monthly and eventually assembled a team that included writer Mark Evanier and artist Dan Spiegle. Blackhawk #251 (October 1982) returned the team to a World War II setting and restored many of the familiar trappings that had been shed over the years during the various attempts to modernize the characters. Numerous new supporting characters were introduced during the run, most notably Domino, a buxom Nazi assassin and love interest to Blackhawk who was reminiscent of the femme fatales so common during the Quality Comics era. Evanier also reintroduced arch-villain Killer Shark, and has said he would have likely added Lady Blackhawk to the cast had the series lasted longer. But faced with stagnant sales that Evanier attributed largely to DC's lack of interest in publicizing the series, the book was canceled with Blackhawk #273 (November 1984). Though it wouldn't be known at the time, that issue would mark the definitive end of the series' original issue numbering.

Sometime after the cancellation, DC employed writer Bill DuBay and artist Carmine Infantino to produce a Blackhawk mini-series. Though never published, numerous finished pages exist.

In 1988, a three-issue mini-series by Howard Chaykin re-imagined the team during World War II yet again, this time with a notably more adult and gritty take on the characters. Chaykin, for the most part, eschewed the team dynamic so familiar to Blackhawk readers, instead crafting a politically charged espionage thriller that focused prominently on Blackhawk and a new version of Lady Blackhawk. Post-war stories respecting Chaykin's continuity followed in Action Comics Weekly #601–608, #615–622, and #628–635, as well as in a monthly series that restarted with an issue #1 and ran 16 issues from March 1989 to August 1990.

In 1992, DC Comics published Blackhawk Special #1. Still respecting Chaykin's continuity and set 10 years after the events of Blackhawk #16, the story spans a five-year period as Blackhawk seeks to avenge the death of team member André.

More recent appearances
Since 1992, mostly modern hints of the team have appeared, usually in the form of the "Blackhawk Express" courier service or the time-displaced Lady Blackhawk. One of the best examples of this is the 1990s appearance of team member Chop-Chop in a few issues of DC's Hawkworld series.

Other Blackhawk air pilot groups have been shown during present time or alternate future events such as Our Worlds At War and Kingdom Come. It is unknown which connection beyond homage and inspiration, if any, those groups have to the classic Blackhawks. Blackhawk at this time is an extension of Checkmate.

DC Comics reprinted the Blackhawk features from the first 17 issues of Military Comics in The Blackhawk Archives Volume 1 (2001) as part of its hardcover DC Archive Editions series.

Blackhawk made an appearance in The Brave and the Bold (Vol. 3) #9 (February 2008), teaming up with the Boy Commandos during a World War II tale.

The Blackhawks appeared in Superman & Batman: Generations 2, in which they help Superman, Spectre, and Hawkman battle a robot during the war. During the battle, Chuck sacrifices himself to destroy a missile.  During the same storyline in 1997, a heroine named Blackhawk appears, battling Sinestro. According to John Byrne's liner notes in Generations 3 #1, this character is Janet Hall, the granddaughter of the original Blackhawk, as well as Hawkman (Carter Hall) and Hawkgirl (Shiera Sanders).

The New 52

In September 2011 as part of its New 52 publishing revamp, DC Comics launched a monthly series titled Blackhawks with no direct ties to the previous incarnations. The book is set in the present day with no appearances by, or mention of, prior Blackhawks, although there is a new version of the Lady Blackhawk character. The book shares the setting of the rebooted DC Universe continuity set up in the Flashpoint mini-series. The series ended with Blackhawks #8 (April 2012) to make way for a "second wave" of New 52 titles.

Fictional team history

Original incarnation

With the overwhelming forces of Nazi Germany flooding into Poland in September, 1939, only the Polish Air Force remains as the last major line of resistance. Captain von Tepp and his Butcher Squadron swarm the skies in response, outnumbering the Polish four to one. The Germans decimate their foes until just one lone plane — painted jet black — remains. After gallantly shooting down six Nazi planes, the mysterious pilot is forced to crash land on the countryside. Running to a nearby farmhouse, he's tracked from the air by von Tepp, who drops a bomb and destroys the building. The pilot locates his dead sister and mortally wounded brother inside. He vows to kill von Tepp before disappearing into the darkness.

Months later, with most of Europe collapsing under the might of the Nazis, the pilot reemerges with his own private squadron and "like an angel of vengeance, Blackhawk and his men swoop down out of nowhere, their guns belching death, and on their lips the dreaded song of the Blackhawks".

In France, Captain von Tepp receives a note from Blackhawk demanding the release of one of Blackhawk's men or face death. Infuriated, von Tepp orders the prisoner's execution by firing squad. At dawn, the man and two others, including a cool-headed English Red Cross nurse (identified as "Ann" in Military Comics #3), are lined against a wall and mocked by von Tepp. As his men prepare to fire, the song of the Blackhawks fills the air:

With the Blackhawks lining the walls of the courtyard, Blackhawk himself confronts von Tepp. After a brief skirmish, von Tepp is abducted and flown to the Blackhawks' secret base in the Atlantic Ocean, Blackhawk Island. It's there that Blackhawk challenges the Nazi captain to an aerial duel. During the ensuring dogfight, both of the men's planes are crippled and forced to crash. On the ground, von Tepp and Blackhawk, both badly injured, draw guns. Von Tepp falls in a hail of bullets.

Blackhawk's team is mostly depicted in Military Comics #1 as shadowy, nondescript soldiers, save for an Englishman named Baker who's never seen or mentioned again. Military Comics #2 (September 1941) expands the role of the team in the featured adventure and introduces five members: Stanislaus, André, Olaf, Hendrick (Hendrickson within a few issues), and Zeg. A sixth, Boris, is also shown, but, like Baker, only makes a single appearance. The designer of their planes, Vladim, is also mentioned.

By Military Comics #3 (October 1941), the roster is firmed up and it's stated that seven men belong to the team. The group also receives a Chinese mascot and cook, Chop-Chop, when his plane happens to crash on Blackhawk Island during a desperate run for help. The adventure concludes with the first on-page death of a team member: André, who seemingly perishes in an avalanche that buries a large group of Nazis. In Military Comics #9 (April 1942), the roster is down to five plus Chop-Chop, with Zeg presumably the absent member. In that adventure, the team crosses paths with the mysterious Man in the Iron Mask; André, in fact, now horribly disfigured, but still an enemy of the Nazis.

The most familiar version of the team is finally locked down in Military Comics #11 (August 1942) shown as consisting of Blackhawk, Olaf, Chuck, André (his face now reconstructed), Stanislaus, Hendrickson, and Chop-Chop.

In Blackhawk #50 (March 1952), the team's origin is documented. Blackhawk himself is no longer identified as being Polish, but rather a Polish-American who is a volunteer flyer in the Polish Air Force. His sidekick in the squadron is Stanislaus, a "brilliant young student" from the University of Warsaw. After facing defeat against the Nazis, Blackhawk attempts to flee to Russia, only to discover that Russian forces are invading from the east. He then seeks refuge in England where he attempts to join the Royal Air Force. It's in London where he and Stanislaus reunite and then meet the four others who will ultimately join them in their crusade: Chuck, another American volunteer; Hendrickson, a recent escapee from a Nazi concentration camp; Olaf, a Swede who had fought for Finland against the Russians; and André, a "valiant Frenchman". The six men wait to enlist in the R.A.F., but because none are British subjects, they are "held up by miles of red tape". Finally, Blackhawk suggests they strike out on their own. They pool their resources and buy planes, setting up a base of operations first on a small island in the Atlantic Ocean, then later in the Pacific. They're eventually joined by Chop-Chop, described in this account as having "fled from China when the Japanese overpowered the Nationalist army". Chop-Chop first acts as the team's cook, but in time becomes an expert pilot and full member of the team.

Post-Crisis
After the Crisis on Infinite Earths, Blackhawk is once again Polish by birth and now given a definitive name, Janos Prohaska. Having joined the Polish Air Force at a young age, he had already become a national hero by 1936 alongside his trusted friends Stanislaus Drozdowski and Kazimierc "Zeg" Zegota-Januszajtis. Prior to the outbreak of World War II, the trio travel across Europe, providing freelance service and even fighting for a time in the Spanish Civil War as members of the Communist party.

At one point finding himself in America in hopes of gathering funds to build a European resistance group, Prohaska is framed for a series of murders. With the help of the Sandman, he's ultimately exonerated, but a report soon surfaces that he has been shot down and killed by Nazis somewhere in the Mediterranean.

When the forces of Nazi Germany invade Poland in 1939, Prohaska returns home to help defend his homeland. He's unable to save his younger siblings, Józek and Staszka, and soon forced to flee to Britain with Stanislaus and Zeg. It's there he meets the others who will form the foundation of the Blackhawk Squadron.

In the midst of the war, Prohaska finds himself under suspicion by the U.S. government for his Communist ties. Around this same time, the Blackhawks are joined by Captain Natalie Reed (born Natalie Gurdin), a brilliant Russian-American flight engineer who redesigns the Blackhawks' aircraft and is dubbed Lady Blackhawk by the U.S. press. It's with her help that Prohaska is able to stop Nazi agent and onetime Hollywood actor Death Mayhew from detonating an atomic bomb in New York City. The victory restores Blackhawk's reputation.

The New 52
In 2011, the entire line of DC Comics was rebooted as part of "The New 52". In this new version the Blackhawks are an elite covert military unit taking care of High Technology Criminals. During this period their main mission was to deal with terrorist group "Mother Machine". During this storyline their cover is exposed and their existence becomes known to the public and the team must deal with the backlash as well.

Rebirth
In Dark Nights: Metal #1, Kendra Saunders is introduced as Lady Blackhawk, she is now the leader of the Blackhawks, an anti-apocalyptic team with the mission to prevent the Dark Multiverse from destroying Earth-0. She also introduces the Blackhawk Island, a place where cosmic energy conducted through the earth's metal core cancels itself out, creating a kind of static that disrupts space-time, the Island served as well for many years as a base of operations for Hawkman and Hawkgirl.

Lady Blackhawk and the Blackhawks are featured in All-Star Batman second arc, "Ends of Earth", they are seen hounding Batman, and they are shown to possesses an armor that has the ability to track eye-line movement, the armor also turns them invisible.

Team depictions

Original incarnation
After a period of membership fluctuations during the first 10 issues of Military Comics, the team finally settles into its most famous roster. Although minor character details would shift and change over time, this original version of the team would stay largely intact from the characters' debut in 1941 to the end of their first run in 1968. At one point or another, every member of the team except Blackhawk is depicted in ways stereotypical for the time, and over the course of the series several would develop their own catchphrases.

 Blackhawk – first Polish, then American, the man known as Blackhawk is portrayed as a strong, decisive leader. He's not always easy on his men—calling Olaf a "big fat-head", for example—but always appears to command their unquestionable respect. At one point late in the first series' run, he's given a name, Bart Hawk.
 Stanislaus – Blackhawk's second-in-command. Polish, Stan is initially depicted like his teammates with various ethnic distinctions, but those disappear as the series progresses to the point that he could very well pass for an American. He is often portrayed as an acrobat, then later as the team's strongman.
 Chuck – at different times stated as being from Brooklyn or Texas, Chuck is often shown as the team's communications specialist. His words are peppered with frequent American colloquialisms like "I reckon!" and "Dagnabbit!"
 Hendrickson – known as "Hendy" for short, the oldest of the Blackhawks is also their ever-dependable sharpshooter. Heavyset with white hair and a thick, Germanic mustache, he's usually portrayed as Dutch (though German in some accounts), and often exclaims, "Himmel!" (German for "sky" and "heaven") or "Ach du lieber!" (a German phrase akin to "Oh, dear!").
 André – with his pencil-thin mustache and natural born suavity, André's appreciation of beautiful women often leads the team into precarious situations. Their demolitions expert, he frequently utters "Sacre bleu!" (an old French profanity).
 Olaf – a giant of a man, Olaf is usually portrayed as Swedish, his brutish size and poor English playing into the "big, dumb Swede" stereotype. He often shouts, "Py Yiminy!" and demonstrates impressive acrobatic abilities (a trait that Stanislaus' character loses over time).
 Chop-Chop – Chop-Chop is originally the team's Chinese cook and essentially Blackhawk's sidekick, riding along in Blackhawk's plane as opposed to piloting his own. He evolves over time from comic relief mascot to a valued member of the team proficient in the martial arts. His full name is eventually revealed to be Liu Huang.

Other short-term members are Baker, an Englishman, and Boris, a Russian. Both characters only make single panel appearances. Zeg, Polish like Blackhawk and Stanislaus, manages to last a bit longer, but is gone by the Blackhawk's ninth appearance in Military Comics.

A significant ally to the team throughout the 1940s is Miss Fear, who never formally joins the group but appears frequently during their Asian missions, developing a romantic interest in Blackhawk himself.

The strip's most significant supporting character, however, is Zinda Blake, also known as Lady Blackhawk. After a failed attempt to become the team's first female member, she is eventually awarded honorary status and makes numerous appears from 1959 to 1968, even becoming the villainess Queen Killer Shark for a time.

The team acquires an animal mascot in the 1950s, Blackie the hawk. Possessing remarkable intelligence he can type notes in plain English, among other skills and fitted with his own miniature belt radio, he's often shown perched on Blackhawk's shoulder.

1967's New Blackhawk Era

When the Blackhawks are proven by the secret spy organization G.E.O.R.G.E. (the Group for Extermination of Organizations of Revenge, Greed, and Evil) to be inept and ineffective as a modern-day fighting force against the evils of the world, the team regroups and dons dramatic new identities that, as the U.S. President happily observes, returns them to their rightful place as one of America's "top trouble-shooting teams". For 14 issues beginning with Blackhawk #228 (January 1967), the Blackhawks become:

 The Big Eye (Blackhawk) – Constantly monitoring the activities of his squad from the Hawk-Kite, a mammoth dirigible made to look like a two-headed hawk, Blackhawk is the only one of the seven to not take on a new alter-ego.
 The Golden Centurion (Stanislaus) – Clad in the gleaming gold armor of a dead foe, Stan not only gains the ability to fly, but can also fire bolts of "ionized pure gold".
 The Listener (Chuck) – Chuck facilitates communication between the team, wearing what resembles pajamas covered with drawings of ears.
 The Weapons-Master (Hendrickson) – Hendy is the team's master of weaponry.
 M'sieu Machine (André) – André becomes designer of exotic crime-fighting gadgets.
 The Leaper (Olaf) – Donning a rubber-titanium outfit reminiscent of a human cannonball circus performer, Olaf's natural acrobatic abilities are now complemented with the ability to leap and bounce great distances.
 Dr. Hands (Chop-Chop) – Mixing martial arts with beryllium-encased hands, Chop-Chop is able to "smash through practically anything".

The change was very unpopular; in the span of a year, the series lost an average 71,000 readers per issue. The "New Blackhawk Era" ends after just 14 issues when G.E.O.R.G.E. headquarters is unceremoniously destroyed, leaving the Blackhawks with only their classic blue and black uniforms.

1976–1977
When the series resumes in 1976, it features a mercenary team composed of familiar unaged faces. Their origins and place in the DC Universe are never explained, though it is firmly stated that this version of the Blackhawks consists of "the original seven" and surmises that they had "first banded together in the fifties to battle a growing number of costumed villains and foes". The members of the team are described as follows:

 Blackhawk (also referred to as Bart Hawk and Mr. Cunningham) – The head of one of the largest aircraft manufacturing companies in the world, and a man who commands "a working knowledge of science with specialties in aviation and aerodynamics".
 Stanislaus – The Polish "financial wizard" of Cunningham Aircraft.
 André – The French mechanics expert.
 Olaf – The Swedish junior member of the group.
 Hendrickson – The Dutch elder of the group and the full-time "sentinel" of the team's secret base, Blackhawk Island.
 Chuck – The American communications expert and team scientist.
 Chopper (formerly known as Chop-Chop) – The Chinese master of martial arts and the team's most skilled flier, "save for Blackhawk himself".

Early in the run, Boris - "the eighth Blackhawk", as he refers to himself - reemerges as the super-powered villain Anti-Man, hellbent on destroying the team as revenge for leaving him for dead on a long ago mission. Shown in flashback wearing the Blackhawks' classic blue and black uniform, even then as a member he exhibits surprising aggression toward his teammates.
 
With Hendrickson left ailing in the final issue of the run, and Chuck seemingly killed in battle, it's possible that big changes were in store for the team's line-up had the series continued past Blackhawk #250. Two possible replacements are set up, either of whom could have also taken the mantle of Lady Blackhawk: Duchess Ramona Fatale (also referred to as "Patch"), a mercenary with questionable allegiances, but harboring love for Blackhawk; and Elsa, Hendrickson's daughter.

1982–1984
With the team's return to a World War II setting, many basic aspects of the original incarnation are restored, complemented by what writer Mark Evanier called "a more contemporary attitude towards characterization". The core members are:

 Blackhawk – Described as "Polish American" and referred to as Bart on a few occasions. He abhors killing, doing so only in self-defense. He's strong and level-headed, not always reacting as swiftly or as violently as some of his men might like.
 Stanislaus – Blackhawk's Polish second-in-command and loyal friend. Lacking confidence from being in Blackhawk's shadow for so long, he envies Blackhawk's strong leadership capabilities.
 André – A former member of the French resistance, he's the team's experienced military planner and full-time ladies' man.
 Olaf – A Swede whose tall height and thick accent plays into a common stereotype, but in actuality conceals amazing acrobatic skills and a savvy mind in combat.
 Hendrickson – The team's Dutch weapons master and sharpshooter. The oldest of the group, he grapples with feelings of resentment, often left feeling like his much-younger teammates don't always make full use of his wisdom.
 Chuck – A Texan who volunteered for the British R.A.F. before bringing his expert piloting and mechanic skills to the Blackhawks. He is portrayed as tougher and more rude than previous depictions.
 Chop-Chop – Both the youngest and the newest member of the team, he's a martial arts master named Wu Cheng.

Also introduced during the run is Lieutenant Theodore Gaynor of the United States Marine Corps, who joins the team when Chop-Chop takes a leave of absence to fight the Japanese in China. Gaynor leaves the team after it is learned his hardline stance against the Germans includes the execution of not only Nazi soldiers, but also civilians.

1988–present
After the Crisis on Infinite Earths rewrites the history of the DC Universe, the Blackhawks' own history, both during World War II and after, undergoes yet more transformation. The members are:

 Major Janos Prohaska (Blackhawk) – Reestablished as being born and raised in Poland, Prohaska is portrayed as the consummate leader, but also as a brash, hard-drinking womanizer. He is also revealed to have been a member of the Communist Party, expelled by Joseph Stalin after opposing the Molotov–Ribbentrop Pact, a 1939 treaty of non-aggression between the Soviets and Nazi Germany.
 Captain Stanislaus Drozdowski – Longtime friend of Blackhawk's who fights alongside him in the Polish Air Force before becoming one of the earliest members of the Blackhawks—and one of the team's first casualties.
 Captain André Blanc-Dumont – An excellent but slightly reckless pilot, the Frenchman is second-in-command of the team, as well as Prohaska's closest confidant and frequent co-pilot.
 Captain Olaf Friedriksen – Danish in this version, athletic Olaf is a savant with languages and skilled at radio operations.
 Captain Ritter Hendricksen – The Dutch marksmen and demolitions expert, as well as the oldest member of the team.
 Captain Carlo "Chuck" Sirianni – An Italian-American from New Jersey who served with the U.S. Office of Strategic Services before joining the team and becoming their chief navigation officer. Chuck is also a dabbler in electronics and aeronautic technology.
 Lieutenant Weng Chan (Chop-Chop) – Chinese and said to be just 17 when he first joins the team, Weng is a skilled pilot, flight mechanic, and cook.
 Captain Natalie Reed (Lady Blackhawk) – Brilliant Russian-American flight engineer who redesigns the Blackhawks' aircraft and fights alongside them. She gives birth to a son in 1945, the product of a brief affair with Hendricksen.

Other early members of the team include Russians Boris Zinoviev and Kazimierc "Zeg" Zegota-Januszajtis, and Englishman Ian Holcomb-Baker, who are "the first to fall in battle". Later team members include African-American Grover Baines, Malaysian Quan Chee Keng (known as "Mairzey"), and Mexican Paco Herrera.

2011–present
Core members of the Blackhawk Squadron as depicted in the New 52 era:

 Colonel Andrew Lincoln – Deputy of operations.
 Lady Blackhawk
 Kunoichi – Japanese field operative.
 The Irishman – Ukrainian field operative.
 Attila – Hungarian field operative.
 Canada
 Wildman – Field support operative.

Evolution of Chop-Chop

Throughout the 1940s and well into the 1950s, Chop-Chop provides comic relief in the Blackhawk strip and is depicted as more of a highly exaggerative caricature amid the realistic art style that otherwise surrounds him. Fat, buck-toothed, and orange-skinned, he speaks in broken English, wears a queue hairstyle complete with a bow, and dresses in colorful coolie garb. This depiction, although now considered offensive, was not atypical of World War II-era depictions of Asians especially the Japanese. A popular character at the time, Chop-Chop also appears in his own humor feature in the Blackhawk series from 1946 to 1955.

Even in his very earliest appearances, he demonstrates tremendous competency and bravery, arriving on Blackhawk Island in a plane of his own construction, and then, relatively soon after, is shown fighting right alongside Blackhawk in a hand-to-hand melee. Despite this, he's long portrayed as essentially Blackhawk's sidekick, riding along in Blackhawk's plane as opposed to piloting his own and often brandishing a cleaver in battle.

In 1952, it's firmly stated that he's a full member of the team, and from 1955 to 1964, he slowly transforms into a more realistically drawn character, changes that culminate when the Blackhawks take on a major uniform change for the first time in their history and Chop-Chop finally joins them in his choice of wardrobe. When the team later reverts to their traditional blue and black uniforms, he dons one for the first time.

When the 1980s World War II-set revival of the series begins, Chop-Chop is again shown in a variation of his original outfit (and even clutches a cleaver on the cover of the first issue). It's quickly apparent, however, that the similarities end there and that he's far from comic relief. As the run progresses, it's revealed that he feels slighted by his teammates, not given proper enough respect to even wear the same uniform as them. Realizing their embarrassing oversight, they bestow to him with great ceremony a standard uniform and his own plane to mark him as a respected member of the group.

After DC Comics' company-wide crossover event Crisis on Infinite Earths revamped and streamlined many of DC's properties, Chop-Chop has almost exclusively been depicted with a build similar to his comrades and wearing the Blackhawks' standard uniform. His past likeness and role as sidekick is addressed, shown as a character in a comic book about the Blackhawks, which he finds infuriatingly insulting.

1983 controversy
In Blackhawk #263 (October 1983), writer Mark Evanier took over the "Blackhawk Bylines" letter column to address an anonymous editorial written by a staff member of the Richmond Times-Dispatch that ran in the paper's February 6, 1983, edition. Evanier wrote of the piece:

An admittedly stunned Evanier readily denounced the column, challenging the editorial writer's assertion that Steven Spielberg, at the time rumored to be interested in making a Blackhawk film, should be faithful to the original depiction of Chop-Chop. Evanier wrote that it's amazing to him that "anyone could believe that Chinese folks were really obese and stupid in the forties" or that Spielberg would ignore the box office and "commit professional suicide by so depicting them".

When asked later if the editorial hastened Evanier's own approach to evolving the character, Evanier said he thought he would have pursued the same course regardless, giving the editorial "probably more attention than it deserved".

Aircraft

Grumman XF5F Skyrocket
The Grumman XF5F Skyrocket is the twin-engine fighter most identified with the Blackhawks. The team is nearly always shown flying modified versions of the plane during their World War II adventures and for some time thereafter. As Will Eisner remembered:

Other notable aircraft

Additionally, other planes made appearances during the course of strip:
 PZL.50A Jastrząb – This is the plane that Blackhawk flew in Poland during the Nazi invasion of 1939.
 Republic F-84 Thunderjet – By the early 1950s, the Blackhawks converted the squadron to jets. This was the Blackhawk Squadron's first jet aircraft:
 Lockheed XF-90 – This actual experimental fighter was adapted to become the fictional:
 F-90 "B" – The Blackhawks flew this plane from 1950 to 1955.
 F-90 "C" – The Blackhawks were flying this model by 1957.
 Republic F-105 Thunderchief – The Blackhawks modified this plane to have VTOL capability.
 Lockheed F-94 Starfire – This is the plane that Lady Blackhawk flew.

International incarnations

The Blackhawk concept and characters proved to be popular on the international market as well as in the United States. Quality Comics licensed the rights along with many of their other characters to London's Boardman Books, which used them in a series of three-color reprints from 1948 to 1954. Boardman also reprinted Blackhawk stories in their Adventure Annual series of hardcover Christmas publications. Many of the British Blackhawk reprints were repackaged by Boardman art director Denis McLoughlin, who created at least one British original Blackhawk story, as well as the illustrations for several Blackhawk text stories. After Boardman's contract lapsed, Strato Publications launched a square-bound 68-page Blackhawk series which ran for 37 issues between 1956 and 1958.

Early crossover
In Hit Comics #26 (February 1943), Blackhawk participated in an early example of a crossover when fellow Quality Comics character Kid Eternity summons him to stop a mad scientist.

Other versions

Flashpoint
 In the Flashpoint reality, the Blackhawk Squadron, equipped with F-35s and with Hal Jordan and Carol Ferris among its pilots, respond to attacks on New Themyscira, but are killed by Amazonian forces.

In other media

Television

 A 1968 "presentation drawing" from Filmation depicts a red-shirted interpretation of Blackhawk and a member of the squadron fighting a group of aliens. Created during the height of The Superman/Aquaman Hour of Adventures popularity, the artwork is believed to have been part of an attempt to convince CBS of the animation viability of other DC Comics properties.
 The Blackhawk squadron appear in series set in the DC Animated Universe (DCAU).
 The Blackhawks appear in the Justice League three-part episode "The Savage Time", with the unidentified leader voiced by Robert Picardo. They join forces with Steve Trevor, the Easy Company, and the time-traveling Justice League to thwart Vandal Savage's plot to help Nazi Germany win WWII and eventually conquer the world.
 An elderly Chuck appears in the Justice League Unlimited episode "I Am Legion", voiced by Seymour Cassel. As of the present, he is the last living Blackhawk, and married Mairzey sometime prior. The Secret Society attack the decommissioned Blackhawk Island to steal the Blackhawks' technology, but only succeed in stealing the Spear of Longinus before being repelled by Chuck and the Justice League.
 A contemporary private security company called the Blackhawk Squad Protection Group appears in the Arrow episode "Trust But Verify", with Theodore Gaynor (portrayed by Ben Browder), Paul Knox (Colin Lawrence), Cavanaugh (Jae Lee), and Blake (portrayed by an uncredited actor) as prominent employees. Gaynor was John Diggle's former commanding officer in Afghanistan before turning to crime. While leading a group of Blackhawk employees in raiding armored cars, Gaynor is eventually killed by Oliver Queen.

Film
 Blackhawk appears in a self-titled serial, portrayed by Kirk Alyn.
 The Blackhawk squadron appears in Justice League: The New Frontier. They assist the Justice League in fighting the Centre's creatures.
 In the early 1980s, Steven Spielberg announced plans to direct a film adaptation of the Blackhawk comic book series, with Dan Aykroyd attached to play the title character. However, the project was canceled and Spielberg chose to direct Raiders of the Lost Ark instead. In April 2018, Warner Bros. revived the Blackhawk project for the DC Extended Universe (DCEU), with Spielberg returning to direct and produce and David Koepp writing the screenplay. Additionally, Spielberg would co-produce the film with Kristie Macosko Krieger and Sue Kroll and it was initially expected to begin after he completed West Side Story. Koepp later added that he is now working on the script, but is unsure if Spielberg will direct.

Miscellaneous
 Blackhawk appears in a self-titled radio series, voiced by Michael Fitzmaurice.
 A Blackhawk squadron-esque group called the Skysharks appear in Alan Moore's Top 10: The Forty-Niners.
 The Blackhawk squadron appear in the novel Blackhawk, by William Rotsler.

Merchandise
 A limited-edition Blackhawk G.I. Joe action figure was produced in 2002 by Dreams & Visions and licensed by DC Comics and Hasbro. The figure comes with the blue-black flight uniform from World War II, Blackhawk's red and green uniform from the mid to late 1960s, and a sky blue Arctic survival uniform.
 In July 2006, DC Direct released a 6.58" Blackhawk action figure in series 1 of the DC: The New Frontier toyline.
 In 2009, Mattel released a Blackhawk figure as part of their Justice League Unlimited toyline.
 In 2008, figures of Blackhawk, Stanislaus, and Hendrickson were released for HeroClix.

Magazine parodies
 MAD magazine featured a parody of Blackhawks called "Black and Blue Hawks".
 National Lampoon produced a parody titled "Whitedove", in which the heroes are inspectors from UNESCO.

See also
 PZL.37 Łoś bomber
 PZL P.11 fighter
 No. 303 Polish Fighter Squadron
 The history of the Polish Air Force
 Polish contribution to World War II
 Seven Soldiers of Victory
 List of film serials

Notes

References

 Blackhawk at the International Catalogue of Superheroes

Further reading

External links
 Unofficial Blackhawk comics site
 Earth-2 Blackhawk Index
 Earth-1 Blackhawk Index
 Mike Kooiman's Blackhawk History 1940–2011
 Blackhawk Profile
 Blackhawk cover gallery
 Panel that discusses Blackhawk's creation (in two parts)
 Article on the history of "Chop-Chop"

Golden Age superheroes
1941 comics debuts
Comics characters introduced in 1941
American radio dramas
Aviation comics
Characters created by Will Eisner
Comics by Bob Haney
DC Comics military personnel
DC Comics titles
Fictional aviators
Quality Comics superheroes
Quality Comics titles
Fictional World War II veterans
War comics
DC Comics adapted into films
Comics adapted into radio series
Comics adapted into television series
Comics adapted into animated series
Fictional Polish people
Fictional Polish-American people
Fictional fighter pilots